Moment of Truth is an album that the Gerald Wilson Big Band recorded in 1962 and released on the Pacific Jazz label.

Reception

AllMusic rated the album with 4½ stars; in his review, Scott Yanow said: "Gerald Wilson's Pacific Jazz albums of the 1960s were arguably the most significant of his career. ...Recommended".

Track listing 
All compositions by Gerald Wilson except as indicated
 "Viva Tirado" - 5:40
 "Moment of Truth" - 4:15
 "Patterns" - 5:54
 "Teri" - 2:54
 "Nancy Joe" - 2:37
 "Milestones" (Miles Davis) - 5:30
 "Latino" - 5:00
 "Josefina" - 4:18
 "Emerge" (Lester Robertson) - 3:22

Personnel 
Gerald Wilson - arranger and conductor
John Audino, Jules Chaiken, Freddie Hill, Carmell Jones, Al Porcino (tracks 6-9) - trumpet
Lou Blackburn, Bob Edmondson, Lester Robertson (tracks 6-9), Frank Strong (tracks 6-9) - trombone
Bob Knight - bass trombone
Joe Maini - alto saxophone
Bud Shank - alto saxophone, flute
Teddy Edwards, Harold Land - tenor saxophone
Jack Nimitz (tracks 6-9), Don Raffell - baritone saxophone
Jack Wilson - piano
Joe Pass - guitar
Jimmy Bond - bass
Mel Lewis - drums
Modesto Duran - congas (tracks 1 & 7)

References 

Gerald Wilson albums
1962 albums
Pacific Jazz Records albums
Albums arranged by Gerald Wilson
Albums conducted by Gerald Wilson